The State Attorney of the Transvaal was the principal legal officer of the Transvaal, or, as it was also known, the South African Republic.

See also
State President of the South African Republic
State Secretary of the South African Republic

South African Republic
1876 establishments in the South African Republic